For information on all Southern Virginia University sports, see Southern Virginia Knights

The Southern Virginia Knights football program is a college football team that represents Southern Virginia University in the NCAA Division III. They are a member of the USA South Athletic Conference. The team has had 6 head coaches since its first recorded football game in 2003.

History

Classifications

Conference Memberships

Notable games
On August 30, 2008 Southern Virginia played Division I FCS Morehead State and lost 6–49.
On September 5, 2009 Southern Virginia played Division I FCS Morehead State and lost 10–61.
On August 30, 2012 Southern Virginia played Division I FCS Morehead State and lost 0–55.
On October 4, 2014 Southern Virginia played its first New Jersey Athletic Conference game and lost in overtime against Kean University 28–27.
On November 10, 2018 Southern Virginia played its last game as a member of the New Jersey Athletic Conference against The College of New Jersey and lost 30-33.
On April 9, 2021, Southern Virginia defeated North Carolina Wesleyan College in a home game 28-21 after being down 0-21 with 10:43 left in the 3rd quarter. It was the final game of the Spring 2021 season that was affected by the COVID-19 pandemic and their final game as a member of the Old Dominion Athletic Conference.

Seasons

Coaches

References

External links
 Official Website of Southern Virginia Knights Athletics